A Festenummer or Lease number is part of a unit in the Norwegian property register. The abbreviation is Fnr.

Each municipality is divided into a certain number of Gårdsnummers . Each Gårdsnummer is further divided into Bruksnummers. Under a Bruksnummer , a Festenummer can be established as an independent unit that can be traded and pledged . The festenummer indicates that the property is a rental plot, where an annual rental fee is paid to the owner of the Bruksnummer.

A common way of writing a land registry designation is for example. 17/235/2, where 17 is the Gårdsnummer, 235 is the Bruksnummer and 2 is the Festenummer. Another way of writing is Gnr 17, Bnr. 235, Fnr 2.

Land Register Hierarchy
 - Fylkesnummer 
 - Kommunenummer 
Gnr. – Gårdsnummer
Bnr. – Bruksnummer
Fnr. – Festenummer
Snr. – Seksjonsnummer

References

External links
Festenummer

Nordic law
Scandinavian law
Law of Norway
Legal history of Norway